Brizi is an Italian surname. Notable people with the surname include:

Claudio Brizi (born 1960), Italian organist and harpsichordist
Giuseppe Brizi (1942–2022), Italian footballer and manager

See also
Brizio
Brizzi

Italian-language surnames